Recall may refer to: 

 Recall (bugle call), a signal to stop
 Recall (information retrieval), a statistical measure
 ReCALL (journal), an academic journal about computer-assisted language learning
 Recall (memory)
 Recall (Overwatch), a 2016 animated short
 The Recall, a 2017 Canadian-American film
 Recall election, a procedure by which voters can remove an elected official
 Letter of recall, sent to return an ambassador from a country 
 Product recall, a request by a business to return a product
 Recalled (film), a South Korean mystery thriller film
 "Recall", a song by Susumu Hirasawa on the 1995 album Sim City
 Recall, UK term for hook flash

See also
 Perfect recall (disambiguation)
 Total recall (disambiguation)
 
 
 Remember (disambiguation)
 Recalled to Life (disambiguation)